Pleia is a genus of sea snails, marine gastropod mollusks in the family Fasciolariidae, the spindle snails, the tulip snails and their allies.

Species
Species within the genus Pleia include:

 Pleia cryptocarinata Dell, 1956: synonym of Cryptofusus cryptocarinatus (Dell, 1956)

References

External links
 Holotype of Pleia cryptocarinata on web site of Museum of New Zealand Te Papa Tongarewa

Fasciolariidae